The Church of Central Africa Presbyterian (CCAP) is a Presbyterian denomination. It consists of five synods: one in Zambia (Zambia Synod), one in Zimbabwe (Harare Synod) and three in Malawi – Livingstonia Synod in the north of the country, Nkhoma Synod in the centre, and Blantyre Synod in the south.

The CCAP is the largest Protestant denomination in Malawi.

History
Following the arrival of David Livingstone, Scottish Presbyterian churches established missions in Malawi. In 1875, the Free Church of Scotland established itself in northern Malawi with headquarters in Livingstonia, while in 1876 the Church of Scotland set up a mission in Blantyre. In 1889 the Cape Synod of the Dutch Reformed Church in South Africa began work in central Malawi. Initially its base was Mvera, but it later relocated to Nkhoma. These three missions were the start of the three CCAP synods in Malawi.

In 1911 the Livingstonia and Blantyre Synods agreed to join together to form the CCAP although, because of World War I, this union did not take place until 17 September 1924. The CCAP at that time had 28 ministers (about half of whom were African) and 32 elders (almost all of whom were African).

In 1926, the formerly Dutch Reformed Nkhoma Synod joined the CCAP. The Harare Synod joined in 1965, while the Lundazi Synod (now called the Zambia Synod) joined in 1984.

In 1993, the Blantyre Synod issued a statement which acknowledged historically close ties with the Malawi Congress Party (MCP) so that "the church gradually lost its ability to admonish or speak pastorally to the government" and indicated that they did "not want to make the same mistake at this time in order to ensure that the church retains its prophetic voice throughout the coming years of our country’s history."

In 1998, some Charismatic members split from the CCAP to form the Presbyterian Church of Malawi (PCM).

The CCAP entered into a high-profile public feud with Malawian Second Vice President Chakufwa Chihana in 2004 after Chihana told the church not to "meddle" in politics.

Beliefs
The Nkhoma Synod have adopted the Belgic Confession, Heidelberg Catechism, and Canons of Dort as their doctrinal standards.  The Zambia Synod subscribes to these and to the Gallican Confession, Scots Confession, Second Helvetic Confession, Thirty-Nine Articles, and Westminster Confession.

Synods
Blantyre Synod (southern Malawi)
Nkhoma Synod (central Malawi)
Synod of Livingstonia (northern Malawi)
Synod of Zambia (Zambia)
Harare Synod (Zimbabwe)

See also
Central Africa

References

External links
Church of Central Africa Presbyterian – Blantyre Synod
Church of Central Africa Presbyterian – StPauls CCAP Church

Presbyterian denominations in Africa
Presbyterianism in Malawi
Presbyterianism in Zambia
Protestantism in Zimbabwe
Members of the World Communion of Reformed Churches
Christian organizations established in 1924
Presbyterian denominations established in the 20th century